New Kru Town is a northwestern coastal suburb of Monrovia, Liberia.

Overview 

New Kru Town is a northwestern coastal suburb of Monrovia, located on the north end of Bushrod Island. It is the only borough in Liberia.

The town grew as a planned "transplant" town of Old Kru Town after World War II when "Old Kru Town was evacuated for the development of a new breakwater for the new port with assistance from the Liberian government". Being located on the corner of the Atlantic Ocean and the Saint Paul River estuary, fishing is an important source of income.

A slum area, it has been subject to ethnic tensions. Squatted houses are built in precarious zones and in 2013, 200 homes were washed away by a high tide. In 2019 President George Weah appointed Tarpeh D. Carter as governor of New Kru Town, replacing Alice Weah. New Kru Town constitutes the Montserrado-16 electoral district.

Landmarks 
An "imposing" church was built in New Kru Town in about 1975 by American missionaries. It also contains the Redemption Hospital and the multi-million dollar D. Tweh Memorial High School, "originally named in honor of Tolbert before the 1980 coup". An avenue, Botoe Avenue, is named after Thomas Nimene Botoe.

Demographics 
New Kru Town (or Zone Z100) is divided into 14 communities;

References

City corporations, townships and borough of the Greater Monrovia District
Squatting in Liberia
Slums in Liberia